Souq Al Bchamkiya is a former souk of the medina of Tunis, specialized in bechmak (Turkish slippers) trading.

History 

The souk was constructed by Yusuf Dey at the same time as his own mosque. It is part of his complex with different building having commercial and religious functions.

With the disappearance of qadis (judges) and mudarris (teachers), the corporation of bechmak craftsmen is dissolved and so did the craft, and its souk.

Location 

The souk is located near the crossing of the Sidi Ben Ziad Street and Souk El Bey. It surrounds the Youssef Dey Mosque from three sides: east, north and west. Some of its shops are placed within the platform holding the mosque.

Nowadays, shops formerly located on the side of Dar El Bey are attached to this monument, and those located under the platform are reallocated to other uses, such as a branch of the Société Tunisienne de Banque.

Products 
With the arrival of the Turks in Tunisia, Turkish clothing style was introduced. Bechmak (pashmak in Turkish) were new shoe ou slipper styles worn by Turks.

The yellow bechmak were worn by men, especially judges of the Hanafi Sunni islamic school, while women wore them in various colors.

Notes and references 

Bechmak